Sidney John Peters (2 December 1885 – 9 January 1976) was a Liberal politician and solicitor in the United Kingdom.

Education and family
Peters was born in Cambridge. He was educated at Cambridge County High School and studied law at Cambridge University and Dublin University. In 1912 he married Essie Mills the daughter of a Cambridge Alderman. They had one son and one daughter.

Public career
Peter was Secretary and Legal Adviser to the Central Council Forage Department for Civil Supplies during the First World War and was Executive Officer, Controlling Department at the Board of Trade.

Parliament
He served as Member of Parliament (MP) for Huntingdonshire from the 1929 general election until 1945, preceding David Renton.  Peters was originally elected as a Liberal, but later changed his allegiance to the National Liberal Party. He served as Parliamentary Private Secretary to the Secretary to the Mines Department, and Parliamentary Private Secretary to the Minister of Labour to 1940.

References

Who was Who OUP, 2007

External links 

1885 births
1976 deaths
Liberal Party (UK) MPs for English constituencies
National Liberal Party (UK, 1931) politicians
UK MPs 1929–1931
UK MPs 1931–1935
UK MPs 1935–1945